Peter Cook is an American communications consultant, journalist, and former government official, currently serving as executive vice president and chief communications officer of the American Bankers Association. He served as press secretary to Ash Carter and as the Assistant to the Secretary of Defense for Public Affairs, replacing Maura Sullivan. He previously served as the Washington anchor for Bloomberg Television.

Personal life
Cook was born and raised in Washington, D.C. He attended St. Albans School before graduating from St. George's School in Rhode Island. He earned a Bachelor of Arts from Duke University and Master of Arts from the Medill School of Journalism at Northwestern University.

Career
Cook began his career in broadcast journalism as an intern for Nightline and hosted shows on Duke Union Community Television.

After college, Cook spent ten years in local news as an anchor and reporter.

In 2000, he helped launch EnergyNewsLive.com. He served as News Director and Washington Bureau Chief for the web-based energy news service, leading the publication's coverage of the California power crisis and the Enron collapse.

Cook worked as a producer and reporter for NBC News and MSNBC. He was assigned to The Pentagon during the Iraq War.

Cook joined Bloomberg Television in October 2003. As Washington anchor and correspondent, he co-anchors Bloomberg’s morning programming and reports on the intersection of business and government. He has interviewed Tim Geithner, Henry Paulson, Lawrence Summers, Chris Dodd, Mitch McConnell, and Jamie Dimon.

Cook hosted Bloomberg's "Money & Politics". He anchored the network's primary season and election night coverage, interviewing the major candidates including Barack Obama and John McCain. Cook routinely covers the Fed, Treasury, White House and Congress. Previously he did extensive reporting on the Gulf Coast's recovery from Hurricane Katrina, and traveled to Beijing with Secretary Paulson for a closer look at the economic relationship between the U.S. and China.

References

External links
Bloomberg News - Shelby Says Bernanke Didn't Bring Leadership to Fed: Video 12.17.09
Bloomberg News - Cantwell Says `We Should Go Back to Glass-Steagall' Act: Video 12.16.09
Bloomberg News - Feinberg Says Pay Plan Goal Is to Make Firms Repay U.S.: Video 12.11.09
Media Bistro - FishbowlDC Interview: Cook Cook 04.16.09
"Cook Cook: Bloomberg's Early Riser," The Hill, 03/23/09
Bloomberg News - Giuliani Says He'd Consider Adding Troops in Iraq for Success 6.13.07

Year of birth missing (living people)
Living people
St. Albans School (Washington, D.C.) alumni
St. George's School (Rhode Island) alumni
Duke University alumni
Medill School of Journalism alumni
American reporters and correspondents
American television journalists
American business and financial journalists
Bloomberg L.P. people
American male journalists
United States Assistant Secretaries of Defense